This page documents all tornadoes confirmed by various weather forecast offices of the National Weather Service in the United States from April to June 2021. On average, there are 155 confirmed tornadoes in the United States in April, 276 confirmed tornadoes in May, and 243 confirmed tornadoes in June. April was well below average with only 80 tornadoes. May saw quite a few more tornadoes than April and was near average with 257 tornadoes but with no EF3 or stronger tornadoes. June was also significantly below average with 106 tornadoes.

United States yearly total

April

April 7 event

April 8 event

April 9 event

April 10 event

April 11 event

April 18 event

April 21 event

April 23 event

April 24 event

April 25 event

April 27 event

April 28 event

May

May 2 event

May 3 event

May 4 event

May 5 event

May 6 event

May 7 event

May 9 event

May 10 event

May 11 event

May 12 event

May 13 event

May 14 event

May 15 event

May 16 event

May 17 event

May 18 event

May 19 event

May 20 event

May 22 event

May 23 event

May 24 event

May 26 event

May 27 event

May 28 event

May 29 event

May 30 event

May 31 event

June

June 1 event

June 2 event

June 3 event

June 6 event

June 7 event

June 8 event

June 9 event

June 10 event

June 11 event

June 12 event

June 13 event

June 14 event

June 16 event

June 17 event

June 18 event

June 19 event
Events in the Southeastern United States were associated with Tropical Storm Claudette.

June 20 event
Event in North Carolina was associated with Tropical Storm Claudette.

June 21 event

June 24 event

June 25 event

June 26 event

June 27 event

June 29 event

See also
 Tornadoes of 2021
 List of United States tornadoes from January to March 2021
 List of United States tornadoes from July to September 2021

Notes

References

2021-related lists
Tornadoes of 2021
Tornadoes
2021, 4
2021 natural disasters in the United States
Tornadoes in the United States